The Darwin Awards is a 2006 American adventure comedy film based on the website of the same name written and directed by Finn Taylor, the film premiered January 25, 2006, at the Sundance Film Festival. The film features Joseph Fiennes, Winona Ryder, David Arquette, Juliette Lewis, Wilmer Valderrama, Chris Penn, Julianna Margulies, Robin Tunney, Lawrence Ferlinghetti, Brad Hunt, Adam Savage, Jamie Hyneman and Metallica. This was Chris Penn's last movie before his death on January 24, 2006, the day before the film's premiere. The film includes several full and partial re-enactments of "Darwin Awards", the earliest of which were fictitious, most notably the debunked JATO Rocket Car story.

Plot
The film opens with a car with a JATO rocket strapped to it. The movie then shifts to Michael Burrows, a criminal profiler for the San Francisco Police Department. Shot in documentary style, the film is ostensibly a dissertation by a film school grad that follows Michael throughout the story. Fired from the police force after his hematophobia allows a serial killer to get away, Michael wallows in a deep depression for several weeks before coming up with a way to combine his Darwin Awards obsession with his talent for profiling. He will help insurance companies detect people more likely to accidentally end their own lives, so they are not sold insurance policies. After impressing an insurance company manager with his profiling talent, Michael is paired up with Siri, a specialist in strange insurance cases.

Siri and Michael travel the country on behalf of the company, investigating several legendary examples of stupidity, such as the JATO rocket car. A pair of men attempting to ice fish become  frustrated and use a stick of dynamite to blast a hole in the ice. The problem is their dog plays fetch with the lit dynamite and runs it back to their brand-new SUV. As they investigate the cases, Michael tries to pinpoint a common factor for these people. The only explanation is a confused monologue by Siri about insurance companies always denying claims and driving people insane.
 
Michael narrowly avoids becoming a Darwin Award winner throughout the movie. He and Siri are stranded in the middle of nowhere on a cold night. Desperate for warmth, he attempts to start a fire with gasoline, causing his car to explode. Siri later confronts Michael, accusing him of being obsessed with the Darwin Awards.

A twist of fate leads to Michael discovering where the murder suspect he originally allowed to escape now lives, as he videotapes the man in his home by rappelling down the side of the building. The film school student is seen for the first time as he, too, is hanging on the side of the building. The problem is his rope is the other end of the same one Michael is dangling by. The stone vase on the roof that the pair is anchored to starts inching closer to the edge. At the same time the serial killer taunts them while slicing open the captive Siri's hand, hoping to trigger Michael's hematophobia. But Michael is able to overcome his fear and defeats the serial killer.

Cast
 Joseph Fiennes as Michael Burrows
 Winona Ryder as Siri Taylor
 David Arquette as Harvey
 Juliette Lewis as Joleen
 Wilmer Valderrama as NumbNuts
 Chris Penn as Tom
 Ty Burrell as Emile
 Kevin Dunn as Insurance executive
 Richmond Arquette as Mr. Pearlman
 Nora Dunn as Mrs. Pearlman
 Judah Friedlander as Simon
 Lukas Haas as Farley
 Tom Hollander as Henry
 Brad Hunt as Stan
 Julianna Margulies as Carla
 Tim Blake Nelson as Perp
 Alessandro Nivola as Garry Hoy
 Max Perlich as Bob
 D. B. Sweeney as Detective Maguire
 Metallica as Themselves
 Robin Tunney as Zoe
 Rhett Ramirez as Andy
 Jamie Hyneman as Military surplus dealer
 Adam Savage as Military surplus dealer

Reception
The film was poorly received by critics, and received a 25% rating on Rotten Tomatoes. Critics typically complained that the film was formulaic and not funny.

References

External links
  for the "Darwin Awards"
 
 
 

Films based on urban legends
2006 films
2006 romantic comedy films
American adventure comedy films
American black comedy films
American independent films
American romantic comedy films
American comedy road movies
2000s comedy road movies
Metro-Goldwyn-Mayer films
Blumhouse Productions films
Films produced by Jason Blum
Films scored by David Kitay
Films set in San Francisco
Films set in the San Francisco Bay Area
2000s English-language films
2000s American films